Cacho Island is the conspicuous 250 m long in east-west direction and 100 m wide rocky island separated by a 160 m wide passage from Aktinia Beach on the southwest coast of Snow Island in the South Shetland Islands. Surface area 1.63 ha. The area was visited by early 19th century sealers.

The feature is named after the Spanish physicist, polar explorer and author Javier Cacho Gómez, participant in the 1986/87 Spanish Antarctic expedition and base commander at Juan Carlos I base in subsequent seasons, for his contribution to the promotion of Antarctica and support for the Bulgarian Antarctic programme.

Location
Bulgarian mapping in 2009.

Maps
 South Shetland Islands. Scale 1:200000 topographic map. DOS 610 Sheet W 62 60. Tolworth, UK, 1968
 L. Ivanov. Antarctica: Livingston Island and Greenwich, Robert, Snow and Smith Islands. Scale 1:120000 topographic map. Troyan: Manfred Wörner Foundation, 2010.  (First edition 2009. )
 Antarctic Digital Database (ADD). Scale 1:250000 topographic map of Antarctica. Scientific Committee on Antarctic Research (SCAR). Since 1993, regularly upgraded and updated

See also
 List of Antarctic and subantarctic islands

Notes

References
 Cacho Island. SCAR Composite Gazetteer of Antarctica
 Bulgarian Antarctic Gazetteer. Antarctic Place-names Commission. (details in Bulgarian, basic data in English)

External links
 Cacho Island. Adjusted Copernix satellite image

Islands of the South Shetland Islands
Bulgaria and the Antarctic